Matlock railway station is owned by Network Rail and managed by East Midlands Railway; it serves the Derbyshire Dales town of Matlock, Derbyshire, England. Through running is technically possible but is not done in normal service.

History

Originally called Matlock Bridge, it was opened by the Manchester, Buxton, Matlock and Midlands Junction Railway. The station saw its first passengers on 4 June 1849, when the line between Ambergate and Rowsley opened. The station buildings, designed by Sir Joseph Paxton, opened in 1850. 

The station master's house is now grade 2 listed.

Crossing the river and the main A6 road, the line passes through Holt Lane Tunnel before entering Matlock station. Being cut through limestone, these tunnels have required a deal of maintenance over the years.

The last day of operation beyond Matlock was Saturday 29 June 1968, two months before regular mainline steam was fully abolished.

Stationmasters
Benjamin Broadhurst 1849- 1869
J.H. Thacker
Henry George Towle ???? - 1876
John Ashton 1876 - 1903 (formerly station master at Codnor Park and Ironville)
Joseph Henry Clarke 1903 - 1911 (formerly station master at Millers Dale)
Harry l’Anson 1911  - 1922 (formerly station master at Bakewell)
John Thomas Austin 1922 - 1928 (formerly station master at Lancaster)
Ernest Shadwell 1928 - 1936
George Washington 1936 - 1942 (afterwards station master at East Ham)
P.B. Crowther 1942 - ???? (formerly station master at Cheadle Heath)

Recent history
Part of the route north of Matlock is now preserved as a heritage railway by the railway preservation group Peak Rail.

At present, the heritage line operates for a distance of a little under  from  through  and nearby  and terminates at Matlock station in the former down platform, interchanging there with rail services on the Derwent Valley Line.

A period of through running to/from  via  began in late 2008 and, from May 2015, most weekday trains ran to/from  via Derby and Nottingham. Weekend services continued to start/end at Nottingham for another year but, from May 2016, most Saturday services were extended to Newark Castle, leaving Sunday the only day with no direct service between Matlock and Newark. In October 2021, East Midlands Railway rearranged their service patterns and, as part of this, weekday services from Matlock were terminated at Derby.

Work within the adjacent Cawdor Quarry resulted in a new superstore for Matlock being opened in 2007 and several hundred new homes are planned to be located nearby. Matlock bus station has also been relocated so as to be adjacent to the railway station, thus giving Matlock a true transport interchange. In the year 1 April 2009 to 31 March 2010, journeys from the station had increased by 40.70%.

The full range of tickets for travel for any destination in the country are purchased from the guard on the train at no extra cost; however, in June 2009, an automatic ticket machine was installed on the platform, enabling passengers to buy or collect tickets bought in advance.

Station layout 
The station has two platforms. The former up platform is used by the Derwent Valley Line while the former down platform is used by Peak Rail. The Network Rail platform is accessed from the station car park while the Peak Rail platform is accessed by a small ramp at the north end connecting to a footpath alongside the station. A footbridge at the south end of the station connects the footpath to the car park. The station building (which is located on the former up platform) is occupied by Peak Rail's transport book shop and a limited station buffet.

The track in the Network Rail platform is connected at both ends while the track in the Peak Rail platform is only connected at the north end. To the north of the station is a run-round loop for Network Rail engineering trains. One line of this loop also serves as the access route for Peak Rail trains to run into the station.

Services

All mainline services at Matlock are operated by East Midlands Railway.

Saturdays also have an hourly service but all the trains originate or end in Derby.

On Sundays, there is a two-hourly service between Matlock and Nottingham in the morning, with services increasing to hourly from mid-afternoon onwards.

Services are formed using diesel multiple units of Classes 156, 158 or 170.

See also
Listed buildings in Matlock Town

References

External links

 Derwent Valley Line Community Rail Partnership
 Peak Rail website

Railway stations in Derbyshire
DfT Category F1 stations
Former Midland Railway stations
Railway stations in Great Britain opened in 1849
Railway stations served by East Midlands Railway
1849 establishments in England
Matlock, Derbyshire